Mt. Shani, also known as Shan and Shanloam (meaning "icy mountain")  is a mountain in the Caucasus. The mountain rises immediately to the east of Stepantsminda, Georgia. The name of the oronym goes back to the Ingush word, "sha, shan" - "ice, icy"

See also
 List of highest points of Russian federal subjects
 List of European ultra prominent peaks

References

External links
 

Mountains of Russia
Mountains of Georgia (country)
International mountains of Europe
International mountains of Asia
Georgia (country)–Russia border
Four-thousanders of the Caucasus
Shani